Real Estate TV, also known as RETV, was an award-winning UK-based television channel and multi-media company that formed part of News Corporation's Fox International Channels' network.

As a simulcast company, RETV was the UK's only dedicated property television channel, and it successfully bridges the divide between traditional television transmission and new media, online, on demand broadcasting.

Launched in October 2004 by Mark Dodd, its founding partner and Bruce Dunlop on the British Sky Broadcasting platform and closed on 1 April 2009, Real Estate TV was available on Sky Channels 262 and 263, on demand on Virgin TV and at www.realestatetv.tv

The channel broadcast 24 hours a day on Sky Channel 262 and had a +1 service available on Sky Channel 263.  RETV broadcast to over 21 million adult viewers in the UK and Ireland, and to millions more across Europe. The company was based at FIC's studios at Shepherd's Bush in London and Real Estate TV was a member of the Association of International Property Professionals.

Steve Dawkins, managing director of the company continued to lead Real Estate TV despite the January 2008 controlling stake purchase by Fox International Channels (FIC)

Programming included the transmission of quality, entertaining property programs from the UK and around the world, as well as RETV commissioned series such as Next Big Thing.

Next Big Thing specifically focuses on global emerging property markets of interest and financial potential to the channel's viewers.

Online on its own dedicated website, RETV offered streaming video, a property finder service, international real estate news and value added viewer services such as currency exchange, insurance and international mortgages.

RETV also offered free-to-view video content via Tiscali, Blinx, Jalipo and BT Vision.  It was as a result of the RETV online expansion and development that in 2006 the channel won the Best Use of Broadband award at the Broadcast Digital Channel Awards and RETV also won the OPP Special Innovation Award in 2007

As an advertisement platform for property professionals, Real Estate TV allowed brand owners to target property-focused consumers through spot advertising, sponsorship, or advertiser funded programming. Tailor-made, long-form advertisements can be produced by the RETV creative team as well, offering developers, agents and property professionals the opportunity to showcase their properties or services in a measurable way to secure leads for example.

List of programmes
 Buyer's Guide to Florida
 Buyer's Guide to Spain
 FOCUS Calabria
 FOCUS Costa de la Luz
 FOCUS Rhodes
 FOCUS Romania
 FOCUS Ski Bulgaria
 FOCUS Slovakia
 FOCUS SW France
 Home for the Future
 House Hunters International
 Living in Algarve
 Living in Andalucia
 Living in Bristol
 Living in Costa Blanca
 Living in Costa de Almeria
 Living in Costa del Sol
 Living in Cyprus
 Living in Docklands
 Living in French Riviera
 Living in Liverpool
 Living in Manchester
 Living in Miami
 Living in Orlando
 Living in Southern Italy
 Location, Location Amazing Homes
 Next Big Thing – Ajman & Ras Al Khaimah
 Next Big Thing – Cape Verde
 Next Big Thing – Caribbean
 Next Big Thing – Costa De La Luz
 Next Big Thing – Costa Vista & Marrakech
 Next Big Thing – Dubai
 Next Big Thing – Morocco
 Next Big Thing – Murcia
 Next Big Thing – Tennessee
 Next Big Thing – Turkey
 Property Matters
 World's Most Extreme Homes

On-air staff
 David Dominey
 Ruth England
 Scott Huggins
 Deborah Hutton
 Kevin Kennedy
 Melissa Porter
 Jo Sinnott
 Suzanne Whang

References

External links
 Digital Spy – "Real Estate TV to Close"

Television channels in the United Kingdom
Television channels and stations established in 2004